The 1976 Chicago White Sox season was the team's 76th season in Major League Baseball, and its 77th season overall. They were 25½ games behind the Kansas City Royals, champions of the American League West.

Offseason

New ownership 
In 1975, White Sox owner John Allyn was broke and placed under enormous pressure from fellow owners to sell his club to Seattle interests and undercut a lawsuit which Seattle had against them. The Seattle lawsuit was directly related to the American League owners' approval of moving the Seattle Pilots franchise to Milwaukee. The AL owners also planned to appease Oakland Athletics owner Charlie Finley by making Chicago available to his A's. Charlie wanted out of Oakland and had years earlier tried to buy the Sox. Everyone was lined up against John Allyn and Chicago's Sox fans.

As fall turned to winter in 1975, Bill Veeck emerged as leader of the sole investment group intent on saving the club for Chicago and its Sox fans. The AL owners reluctantly agreed to his offer and later voted to expand the league to include an expansion franchise in Seattle, Washington. Veeck purchased 80% of the White Sox, effective December 18, 1975.

Notable transactions 
 December 10, 1975: Jim Kaat and Mike Buskey were traded by the White Sox to the Philadelphia Phillies for Dick Ruthven, Roy Thomas, and Alan Bannister.
 December 12, 1975: Ken Henderson, Ozzie Osborn and Dick Ruthven were traded by the White Sox to the Atlanta Braves for Larvell Blanks and Ralph Garr.
 December 12, 1975: Larvell Blanks was traded by the White Sox to the Cleveland Indians for Jack Brohamer.
 December 12, 1975: Rich Hinton and Jeff  (minors) were traded by the White Sox to the Cincinnati Reds for Clay Carroll.
 December 12, 1975: Lee Richard was traded by the White Sox to the St. Louis Cardinals for Buddy Bradford and Greg Terlecky.

Regular season 
With the new ownership, the White Sox changed team colors from red to navy and the uniform style was modified early twentieth century, with collared, untucked jerseys. The AstroTurf infield  at Comiskey Park was removed and replaced with natural grass.

 August 8: The White Sox took the field wearing shorts instead of traditional baseball pants during the first game of a doubleheader against the  Despite winning the game 5–2, the shorts were such a disaster the White Sox dressed in pants for the second game, which they

Season standings

Record vs. opponents

Opening Day lineup 
 Chet Lemon, CF
 Ralph Garr, LF
 Jorge Orta, 3B
 Cleon Jones, DH
 Buddy Bradford, RF
 Jim Spencer, 1B
 Bucky Dent, SS
 Jack Brohamer, 2B
 Pete Varney, C
 Wilbur Wood, P

Notable transactions 
 April 6, 1976: Jeff Holly was released by the White Sox.
 June 8: 1976 Major League Baseball draft
 Steve Trout was selected by the White Sox in the 1st round (8th pick).
 Willie McGee was selected by the White Sox in the 7th round, but did not sign.
 Lorenzo Gray was selected by the White Sox in the 8th round.
 June 15: Pete Varney was traded by the White Sox to the Atlanta Braves for Blue Moon Odom.
 July 14: Rich Coggins was traded by the White Sox to the Philadelphia Phillies for Wayne Nordhagen.
 August 9: Phil Roof was selected off waivers by the White Sox from the Minnesota Twins.
 September 10: Minnie Miñoso was signed as a free agent by the White Sox.

Roster

Player stats

Batting 
Note: G = Games played; AB = At bats; R = Runs scored; H = Hits; 2B = Doubles; 3B = Triples; HR = Home runs; RBI = Runs batted in; BB = Base on balls; SO = Strikeouts; AVG = Batting average; SB = Stolen bases

Pitching 
Note: W = Wins; L = Losses; ERA = Earned run average; G = Games pitched; GS = Games started; SV = Saves; IP = Innings pitched; H = Hits allowed; R = Runs allowed; ER = Earned runs allowed; HR = Home runs allowed; BB = Walks allowed; K = Strikeouts

Farm system

References

External links 
 1976 Chicago White Sox at Baseball Reference

Chicago White Sox seasons
Chicago White Sox season
Chicago